Ada is a health company based in Berlin that operates Ada, an end-user self-assessment Web application.

History 
Ada started out as a platform as a service for doctors. It was adapted in 2016 to focus on the bits patients could understand. The app takes reported symptoms, matches them with symptoms of patients of similar age and gender, and reports the statistical likelihood that the patient has a certain condition.

It was founded by Claire Novorol, a British pediatrician, Martin Hirsch and Daniel Nathrath.
As of 2018, the Ada consumer product, the Web application was available in English, German, Spanish, Portuguese, Swahili, Romanian, and French. As of September 2020, the Ada app has been downloaded 10 million times and completed 20 million symptom assessments. It is free of charge and has the highest consumer rank among similar apps. Thanks to funding from the Bill & Melinda Gates Foundation and Fondation Botnar, in November 2019, Ada launched its app in both Swahili and Romanian.

In 2022 it was integrated into Scout by Sutter Health.

Media coverage 
Ada has been compared to WebMD, Babylon's GP at Hand app, and Your.MD. In October 2017, when three apps were tested with symptoms from asthma, shingles, alcohol-related liver disease, and urinary tract infection, Ada performed very well; it asked about the most important symptoms and provided the best diagnoses. It produced diagrams showing which of the symptoms for each disease were present and the strength of the link, and a diagram of the percentage of people likely to have that diagnosis.

In September 2020, Broadband Commission for Sustainable Development issued a report identifying Ada as of the AI solutions that have the "potential to address existing health inequalities and provide medical expertise to clinicians, health workers, and patients alike - all with the aim of improving the quality, access, and cost of healthcare delivery."

Ada & Rare diseases 
A 2019 retrospective study evaluated Ada DX in rare disease diagnosis. Ada's top suggestion matched the confirmed diagnosis in 89% of cases (83 of 93 cases).
In more than 56% of cases, Ada provided correct disease suggestions earlier than the time of clinical diagnosis. More than 33% of patients could have been identified as having a rare disease in the first documented clinical visit.

Reception 
In 2020, the World Economic Forum awarded Ada and other 99 candidates as its "Technology Pioneers." Since its global launch in 2016, Ada has won several awards, such as App Promotion Summit's Fastest Growing App, Proddys Award for best Health and Fitness Product, CogX: Good Health and Well-being Award, German Brand Award, and German Innovation Award.

See also 

 Abionic
 MagForce
 Vacuactivus

References

2011 establishments in Germany
Medical technology companies of Germany
Companies based in Berlin
Health information technology companies
Private providers of NHS services